Mark P. McKenney (born October 9, 1956) is an American politician and a former Democratic member of the Rhode Island Senate representing District 32. He is an attorney at McKenney, Quigley, & Clarkin.

He considers himself a moderate. He defeated one-term incumbent Jeanine Calkin in the 2018 primary for the seat. He was defeated by Calkin in a 2020 democratic primary rematch for his seat.

References 

1956 births
Living people
Politicians from Warwick, Rhode Island
Democratic Party Rhode Island state senators
21st-century American politicians
Rhode Island lawyers